List of Being Human episodes may refer to:

 List of Being Human (British TV series) episodes
 List of Being Human (North American TV series) episodes